There were six elections in 1925 to the United States House of Representatives

List of elections 
Elections are listed by date and district.

|-
| 
| colspan=3 | Vacant
|  | Incumbent member-elect Julius Kahn (R) died December 18, 1924 during the 68th Congress, after his re-election to the 69th Congress.New member elected February 17, 1925 to begin her husband's term in the 69th Congress.Republican gain.
| nowrap | 

|-
| 
| John J. Rogers
|  | Republican
| 1912
|  | Incumbent died March 28, 1925.New member elected June 30, 1925.Republican hold.
| nowrap | 

|-
| 
| Arthur B. Williams
|  | Republican
| 1923 
|  | Incumbent died May 1, 1925.New member elected August 18, 1925.Republican hold.
| nowrap | 

|-
| 
| George B. Churchill
|  | Republican
| 1924
|  | Incumbent died July 1, 1925.New member elected September 29, 1925.Republican hold.
| nowrap | 

|-
| 
| colspan=3 | Vacant
|  | Member-elect T. Frank Appleby (R) died December 15, 1924 during the 68th Congress, after his re-election to the 69th Congress.New member elected November 3, 1925 to finish his father's term.Republican gain.
| nowrap | 

|-
| 
| Robert Y. Thomas Jr.
|  | Democratic
| 1908
|  | Incumbent died September 3, 1925.New member elected December 26, 1925.Democratic hold.
| nowrap | 

|}

See also 
 68th United States Congress
 69th United States Congress

References 

 
1925